The Apology of the Augsburg Confession was written by Philipp Melanchthon during and after the 1530 Diet of Augsburg as a response to the Pontifical Confutation of the Augsburg Confession, Charles V's commissioned official Roman Catholic response to the Lutheran Augsburg Confession of June 25, 1530. It was intended to be a defense of the Augsburg Confession and a refutation of the Confutation. It was signed as a confession of faith by leading Lutheran magnates and clergy at the meeting of the Smalkaldic League in February, 1537, and subsequently included in the German [1580] and Latin [1584] Book of Concord. As the longest document in the Book of Concord it offers the most detailed Lutheran response to the Roman Catholicism of that day as well as an extensive Lutheran exposition of the doctrine of Justification.

Contents

The major sections of the Apology are listed below, along with the article of the Augsburg Confession that Melanchthon is defending.
Concerning Original Sin—Article II
Concerning Justification—Article IV
Concerning Love and the Fulfilling of the Law
Concerning the Church—Articles VII and VIII
Concerning Repentance—Article XII
Concerning Confession and Satisfaction
Concerning the Number and Use of the Sacraments—Article XIII
Concerning Human Traditions in the Church—Article XV
Concerning the Invocation of Saints—Article XXI
Concerning Both Kinds in the Lord's Supper—Article XXII
Concerning the Marriage of Priests—Article XXIII
Concerning the Mass—Article XXIV
Concerning Monastic Vows—Article XXVII
Concerning Ecclesiastical Power—Article XXVIII

He also refers to some of the other articles in the Augsburg Confession which did not require an extensive defense. These articles are I, III, XVI, XVII, XVIII, XIX, XX.

Textual issues
The first edition of the Apology of the Augsburg Confession was published in late April-early May 1531 in quarto format. Melanchthon continued to revise it, especially the article on justification, and issued a second edition in September 1531, which was published in octavo format. Some scholars believe the second edition is the better edition of the Apology. The Lutheran Church's formal collection of confessions in the Book of Concord refer to the first edition of the Apology when it is quoted in the Solid Declaration of the Formula of Concord. The 1580 German edition of the Book of Concord used the translation of the Apology prepared by Justus Jonas, who rendered it freely based on Melanchthon's further editing. The 1584 Latin edition of the Book of Concord uses the first edition ("editio princeps") of the Apology, following the decision made by the Lutheran estates and rulers at the Diet of Naumburg in 1560 to use only this edition.

The question of which is the "official text" of the Apology arises in connection with the English translation of the text in the 2000 "Kolb-Wengert Edition" of The Book of Concord. The translators and editors of this edition made the octavo edition the main source for their English translation because they believe it to be the "official version" of The Apology. They included English translations of variant readings of the quarto edition in italics. Other scholars question whether this text could be the actual Lutheran confession, especially since it was the quarto edition that was deliberately included in the 1584 official Latin Book of Concord to the exclusion of the octavo edition. All other English translations of The Book of Concord utilize the quarto edition.

Bibliography

 This book contains the first edition (the Quarto edition) and translates it from the Latin 1584 Book of Concord, putting in brackets the translation of material found in the Jonas German translation.
 Contains the best text of the quarto Latin Apology of May 1531, with variants from the 2nd, 3rd, and 4th editions in the footnotes.

 The Bekenntnisschriften is the critical edition of the Lutheran Confessions, offering the latest academic opinions of the various textual forms of the Lutheran Confessions.

References

External links
Apology (HTML) - bookofconcord.org
Apology (Plain Text Download) - Project Gutenberg
 

1531 works
Book of Concord
Christian statements of faith